Unemployment Insurance Tax System of Iowa, USA
 University of Information Technology and Sciences  a private university in Dhaka, Bangladesh
 University Information Technology Services of the Indiana University, USA